Rogachevo is a rural locality (a village) in Dmitrovsky District, Moscow Oblast, Russia. Population:

References 

Rural localities in Dmitrovsky District, Moscow Oblast